The following is a list of mayors of Cheyenne, Wyoming. The current mayor is Patrick Collins.

List

References

 List
Cheyenne